Lamae railway station is a railway station located in Lamae Subdistrict, Lamae District, Chumphon.

Services 
 Rapid 170 Yala-Bangkok
 Rapid 171/172 Bangkok-Sungai Kolok-Bangkok
 Rapid 173/174 Bangkok-Nakhon Si Thammarat-Bangkok
 Rapid 167/168 Bangkok-Kantang-Bangkok
 Local 445/446 Chumphon-Hat Yai Junction-Chumphon

References 
 
 

Railway stations in Thailand
Chumphon province